Oleksandr Zabara (born 5 July 1984) is a Ukrainian retired footballer who last played for Dynamo Brest in Belarus.

Career
Zabara started his senior career with Chornomorets Odesa. After that, he played for Zorya Luhansk, Lokomotiv Minsk, Šiauliai, FK Interas Visaginas, Dnister Ovidiopol, Oleksandriya, and Helios Kharkiv. In 2011, he signed for Dynamo Brest in the Belarusian Premier League, where he made thirty-three appearances and scored two goals.

References

External links 
 “In Ukraine, the standard of living is higher” 
 Zabara: "They don’t make cold borsch in Ukraine" 
 Alexander Zabara: “Even in my thoughts it was not necessary to play transitional matches” 
 Football. Championship of Belarus. Alexander Zabara: when you go out for one or two minutes in the very ending, you always count on a miracle  
 Zabara: "Nobody expected such a game from Helios" 

1984 births
Living people
Ukrainian footballers
Ukrainian expatriate footballers
Expatriate footballers in Belarus
Expatriate footballers in Lithuania
Association football defenders
FC Chornomorets Odesa players
FC Chornomorets-2 Odesa players
FC Zorya Luhansk players
FC SKVICH Minsk players
FC Šiauliai players
Interas-AE Visaginas players
FC Dnister Ovidiopol players
FC Oleksandriya players
FC Stal Kamianske players
FC Helios Kharkiv players
FC Dynamo Brest players